Donald Richards (born 17 December 1942) is an Antiguan cricketer. He played in five first-class matches for the Leeward Islands in 1968/69 and 1969/70.

See also
 List of Leeward Islands first-class cricketers

References

External links
 

1942 births
Living people
Antigua and Barbuda cricketers
Leeward Islands cricketers